Jeffrey C. Williams (born in Seattle, Washington), is a fashion designer who won the second season of Bravo network's Project Runway spinoff, The Fashion Show.

Background
Jeffrey Williams was born in Seattle, Washington. He was born to Jeffrey Williams and Beverly Minnis Williams and grew  up in a blended family of 12 children. He is openly gay. His gift for fashion and design was evident as young as age three, he loved the feel of fabrics, liked picking out his mother's dress up clothing. His mother supported and inspired her prodigious son, supplying him as young as seven, with needles, thread, and fabric his first designs were pillows. By high school he had a fully equipped design studio in his home and a Jeffrey Williams prom gown was desired by his classmates. His gift for design and style was applied to making handmade wigs for his mother during her bout with breast cancer.

Being raised in a large family that was eventually headed by one parent, he knew that the cost of pursuing fashion design would be a hard task to accomplish but after graduating from Garfield High School in 2002, he applied and was accepted in 2004  into the Fashion Institute of Technology in New York City. That same year his mother succumbed to breast cancer. She continues to be an inspiration. His mother left his godmother, Dawn Mason (Former WA State Representative) with instructions that she must see that Jeffrey complete design school, and that  one day he would  be famous.

Education
His talent as an illustrator was recognized by his instructors, and was selected for the highly competitive Illustration program. Then following a desire to add an international appeal to his design he competed for a coveted spot in the study abroad option. Offered by the New York Fashion Institute, he  studied abroad at Politecnico di Milano in Milan, Italy, and developed a love for working as a fashion designer, internationally. Participating in many art programs to gain notoriety. In 2009, Williams graduated from the New York Fashion Institute getting a Bachelors in International Fashion Design. Soon after graduating, he began to collaborate with many other fashion designers in order to better his own individual clothing line. The designers Williams has worked with include Alexander Wang and Peter Som. He has also worked with many celebrity stylists such as Patti Wilson.

Career
By the request of his older sister, Baionne, Williams decided to audition for the second season of the reality television program The Fashion Show. While on the show, he received mixed reactions from the judges. As the show progressed and his fashion designs work began to  improve, and he became popular with the viewing audience he became very competitive. He won as The Ultimate Designer, beating eleven other contestants. On the series finale, he was highly praised by the show's judges Iman, and Mary J. Blige, who described this work as unique and of high value. Since the ending of the show, he has gained confidence to venture into other projects and ideas.

He traveled to India to view fabrics and designs and is now working as a fashion illustrator, a fashion consultant, and a stylist. Residing in New York, he works on his own fashion line.

References

External links
 Official Website

1984 births
Living people
African-American fashion designers
American fashion designers
Participants in American reality television series
LGBT fashion designers
Fashion designers from Seattle
Reality show winners
21st-century African-American people
20th-century African-American people
21st-century American LGBT people
LGBT people from Washington (state)